

Company
 China Wind (Company)
 China Wind Systems

Music
 China Wind music, fusion music combining traditional Chinese cultural elements with global music styles